Home from Home is a 2013 German drama film directed by Edgar Reitz. It was screened out of competition at the 70th Venice International Film Festival. It is shot in black and white, but there are some colour sequences. It is a prequel to the Heimat film series and concerns the Simon family living in the fictional Hunsrück village of Schabbach from 1840–1844.

Cast

Release
Home from Home was screened at the Venice Film Festival in September 2013.

Critical reception
On review aggregator Rotten Tomatoes, the film holds an approval rating of 83% based on 12 reviews, with an average rating of 7.7/10. On Metacritic, the film has a score of 70 out of 100 from 6 critics, indicating "generally favorable reviews".

References

External links
 Official website 
 

2013 films
2013 drama films
Films directed by Edgar Reitz
German drama films
2010s German-language films
2010s German films